The following is a list of Japanese military equipment of World War II which includes artillery, vehicles and vessels, and other support equipment of both the Imperial Japanese Army (IJA), and Imperial Japanese Navy (IJN) from operations conducted from start of Second Sino-Japanese War in 1937 to the end of World War II in 1945.

The Empire of Japan forces conducted operations over a variety of geographical areas and climates from the frozen North of China bordering Russia during the Battle of Khalkin Gol (Nomonhan) to the tropical jungles of Indonesia.  Japanese military equipment was researched and developed along two separate procurement processes, one for the IJA and one for the IJN.  Until 1943, the IJN usually received a greater budget allocation, which allowed for the enormous Yamato-class battleships, advanced aircraft such as the Mitsubishi A6M "Zero" series, and the world's largest submarines. In addition, a higher priority of steel and raw materials was allocated to the IJN for warship construction and airplane construction. It changed to a degree in 1944/45, when the Japanese home islands became increasingly under direct threat, but it was too late. Therefore, during the prior years the Imperial Japanese Army suffered by having a lower budget allocation and being given a lower priority as to raw materials, which eventually affected its use of equipment and tactics in engagements during World War II.

A majority of the materials used were cotton, wool, and silk for the fabrics, wood for weapon stocks, leather for ammunition pouches, belts, etc.  But by 1943 material shortages caused much of the leather to be switched to cotton straps as a substitute.

Swords and bayonets

Small arms

Pistols (manual and semi-automatic)

Automatic pistols and submachine guns

Rifles

Grenades and grenade launchers

Flare guns

Recoilless rifles

Flamethrowers

Machine guns

Infantry and dual-purpose machine guns

Vehicle and aircraft machine guns

Artillery

Infantry mortars
 Type 89 grenade discharger, or 'knee mortar,' firing grenades or 50mm shells.
 Type 98 50 mm mortar
 Type 11 70 mm infantry mortar (rifled bore)
 Type 97 81 mm infantry mortar
 Type 99 81 mm mortar – fired by hammer strike
 Type 94 90 mm infantry mortar
 Type 97 90 mm infantry mortar (simplified version of Type 94 90 mm infantry mortar)
 Type 2 12 cm mortar
  – actually heavy 150mm mortar, 90 made and used in 1932
 Type 96 150 mm infantry mortar
 Type 97 150 mm infantry mortar (Type 96 150 mm infantry mortar with recoil absorber removed to save weight)

Heavy mortars & rocket launchers
 
 Type 98 320 mm mortar
 Type 4 20 cm rocket launcher
 Type 3 300 mm heavy mortar on Type 4 Ha-To SP heavy mortar carrier
 Type 4 40 cm rocket launcher
 Type 5 mortar launcher "Tok"
Type 10 and Type 3 rocket boosters

Field artillery
 7cm mountain gun (75 mm caliber, short bronze barrel)
 Type 31 75 mm mountain gun (steel version)
 7 cm field gun (75mm caliber, long bronze barrel)
 Type 31 75 mm field gun (steel version)
 Type 41 75 mm mountain gun (license-built Krupp M.08 mountain gun)
 Type 94 75 mm mountain gun (indigenous design to replace Type 41 75 mm mountain gun)
 Type 38 75 mm field gun (license-built Krupp gun)
 Type 41 75 mm cavalry gun (lengthened Type 38 75 mm field gun)
 Type 90 75 mm field gun (indigenous design to replace Type 38 75 mm field gun)
 Type 95 75 mm field gun (supersede Type 90 75 mm field gun to reduce costs)
 Type 99 10 cm mountain gun
 Krupp 10.5 cm cannon
 Type 38 10 cm cannon (license-built Krupp 105mm howitzer M1905)
 Type 91 10 cm howitzer (indigenous light-weight howitzer to supplement Type 38 15 cm howitzer)
 Type 14 10 cm cannon (indigenous design, largely unsuccessful)
 Type 92 10 cm cannon (replacement for Type 14 10 cm cannon)
 120 mm Krupp howitzer M1905
 Type 38 12 cm howitzer (license-built 120 mm Krupp howitzer M1905)
 Type 38 15 cm howitzer (license-built 150 mm Krupp QF howitzer M1905)
 Type 4 15 cm howitzer (changes of Type 38 15 cm howitzer to improve portability)
 Type 96 15 cm howitzer (intended replacement of Type 4 15 cm howitzer)

Fortress and siege guns
 Type 7 10 cm cannon (early production of Type 14 10 cm cannon)
 Type 45 15 cm coast defense gun (1912) – barbette-mounted coastal defense gun
 Type 7 15 cm cannon
 Type 89 15 cm cannon -main heavy gun of Imperial Japanese Army
 Type 96 15 cm cannon
 28 cm howitzer L/10
 Type 45 24 cm howitzer (1912) – replacement for 28 cm howitzer L/10
 Type 96 24 cm howitzer
 Type 90 24 cm railway gun – Built in France
 Type 7 30 cm howitzer (1918) – semi-mobile siege gun
 Experimental 41 cm howitzer

Infantry guns
 Type 11 37 mm infantry gun
 Type 92 70 mm infantry gun (Type 92 battalion gun)

Anti-tank guns
 Type Ra 37 mm AT gun (German 3.7 cm Pak 36 captured from Chinese)
 Type 94 37 mm anti-tank gun
 Type 1 37 mm anti-tank gun – same as Type 94 but with a longer barrel
  – a prototype tested in 1937–1938
 Type 1 47 mm anti-tank gun
  – prototype tested in 1941–1943, cancelled because of the appearance of Allied heavy tanks.

Anti-tank weapons (besides anti-tank guns)
 Type 97 automatic cannon
 Type 99 mine
 Type 93 Pressure Anti-Tank/personnel mine
 Type 2 rifle grenade launcher
 Type 3 AT grenade
 Lunge mine
 57 mm tank cannon
 37 mm tank cannon
 Type 5 45 mm Recoilless gun
 Type 4 70 mm AT Rocket Launcher

Anti-aircraft weapons

Occasional anti-aircraft guns
 Type 97 automatic cannon
 Type 11 light machine gun
 Type 96 light machine gun
 Type 99 light machine gun
 Type 92 heavy machine gun
 Type 1 heavy machine gun
 37mm high elevation angle gun
 modified Type 38 75 mm field gun

Light anti-aircraft guns
 Type 3 heavy machine gun
 Type 4 heavy machine gun
 13.2 mm Hotchkiss machine gun
  – used in independent machine gun companies
 Type 98 20 mm AA machine cannon
 Type 98 20 mm AA half-track vehicle "Ko-Hi"
 20 mm Anti-Aircraft Tank "Ta-Se"
 Type 4 20 mm twin AA machine cannon
 Type 2 20 mm AA machine cannon
 Type 2 20 mm twin AA machine cannon
 Type 98 20 mm AAG Tank with Type 98 Ke-Ni hull
 Type 96 25 mm AT/AA Gun – main IJN gun, over 30,000 units produced
 70/81mm AA mine discharger

Medium & heavy anti-aircraft guns

Vehicles

Tankettes
 Carden Loyd Mk.VI
 Type 92 heavy armoured car (also known as Jyu-Sokosha Type 92 cavalry tank)
 Type 94 tankette "TK"
 Type 97 Te-Ke – improvement of Type 94 "TK"
   (armed with Type 98 20 mm AA machine cannon)
 Model 94 3/4 ton tracked trailer – towed by tankettes

Amphibious tanks
 Type 92 A-I-Go (experimental, modified hull of Type 92 heavy armoured car)
 Type 1 Mi-Sha (a/k/a Type 1 Ka-Mi) (experimental)
 Type 2 Ka-Mi (modified hull of Type 95 Ha-Go)
 Type 3 Ka-Chi (modified hull of Type 1 Chi-He)
 Type 4 Ka-Sha (Type 4 Chi-To or Type 5 Chi-Ri with floats – planned only)
 Type 5 To-Ku (modified hull of Type 5 Chi-Ri)
Note: Amphibious tanks were used by the IJN.

Tanks and related vehicles
 Tank Mk IV – British World War I vintage
 Medium Mark A Whippet – British World War I vintage
 Renault FT-17 "Ko" light tank – World War I vintage
 Renault NC27 "Otsu" light tank
 M3 light tank – captured
 Experimental Tank – Number 1 – 1st prototype leading to the Type 89 I-Go
 Type 89 I-Go
 Type 91 heavy tank – 2nd prototype leading to Type 95 heavy tank
 Type 95 heavy tank – multi-turret tank; four prototypes completed
 Ji-Ro Sha SPG – Type 95 heavy tank hull, 105 mm cannon
 Hi-Ro Sha SPG (also known as Hiro-sha) – Type 95 heavy tank hull, 150 mm cannon
 Type 95 Ha-Go (also known as Type 95 Ke-Go or Type 95 Kyu-Go)
 Type 98 Ke-Ni (also known as Type 98 Chi-Ni) – major improvement of Type 95 Ha-Go
 Type 2 Ke-To – variant of Type 98 Ke-Ni with improved 37 mm cannon
 Type 98 Ta-Se – prototype 20 mm Anti-Aircraft tank with Type 98 Ke-Ni hull
 Type 98 20 mm AAG tank – prototype with Type 98 Ke-Ni hull and twin Type 2 20 mm AA machine cannons
 Special Number 3 Light Tank Ku-Ro – airborne tank carried by glider Ku-6 (early development version known as So-Ra)
 Type 3 Ke-Ri – Type 95 Ha-Go tank with 57 mm main gun. Prototype failed army trials in 1943
 Type 4 Ke-Nu – Ha-Go hull with a 57 mm main gun in a Chi-Ha turret
 Type 4 Ho-To SPG – prototype with a Ha-Go hull fitted with Type 38 12 cm howitzer
 Type 5 Ho-Ru SPATG – prototype based on modified hull of the Ha-Go with a Type 1 47 mm tank gun
 Type 97 Chi-Ha – with Type 97 57 mm tank gun; the most advanced Japanese tank available in numbers at start of the Pacific War
 Type 97 Shinhoto Chi-Ha – Chi-Ha hull with an enlarged turret and production model Type 1 47 mm tank gun
 Type 1 Ho-Ni I SPG (tank destroyer) – Chi-Ha hull with Type 90 75 mm field gun
 Type 1 Ho-Ni II SPG (tank destroyer) – Chi-Ha hull with Type 91 10 cm howitzer
 Type 3 Ho-Ni III SPG (tank destroyer) – Chi-Ha hull with Type 3 75 mm tank gun, same as Type 3 Chi-Nu tank
 Type 2 Ho-I Infantry support tank – Type 41 75 mm mountain gun on hull of Chi-Ha
 Type 4 Ho-Ro SPG – Chi-Ha hull with Type 38 15 cm howitzer
 Type 3 Chi-Nu – improved Chi-Ha hull fitted with large new hexagonal turret with Type 3 75 mm tank gun
 Short Barrel 120 mm gun tank (1945) – 120 mm naval gun in a Type 97 Shinhoto Chi-Ha turret on a Chi-Ha hull, for infantry support
 Long Barrel 120 mm SPG (1945) – 120 mm naval gun on a Chi-Ha hull – prototype only
 Type 5 Ho-Chi SPG – (design study), Chi-Ha hull fitted with a Type 96 15 cm howitzer
 Type 1 Chi-He – major improvement of the Chi-Ha series with a more powerful engine, thicker armor and using the Type 1 47 mm tank gun
 Ta-Ha SPAAG – (design study), Type 1 Chi-He hull with twin 37 mm anti-aircraft guns
 Type 98 Chi-Ho (also known as Type 98 experimental medium tank) – prototype with an enlarged turret and the then "experiential" Type 1 47 mm tank gun
 O-I (1940), 100-ton tank (design study)
 O-I (1943), 120-ton tank (prototype)
 Type 4 Chi-To (2 completed) – up-scaled Type 97 Shinhoto Chi-Ha with Type 5 75 mm tank gun
 Type 5 Ka-To tank destroyer (unfinished prototype) – Extended Type 4 Chi-To hull fitted with a 105 mm cannon
 Type 5 Chi-Ri – (unfinished prototype) to be fitted with Type 5 75 mm tank gun and later to be up-gunned with an 88 mm main gun
 Type 5 Ho-Ri tank destroyer (unfinished prototype) – Type 5 Chi-Ri hull fitted with a 105 mm cannon
 Type 5 Ke-Ho (prototype) – intended to be successor of Type 95 Ha-Go
 Type 5 Na-To (tank destroyer) – Type 5 75 mm tank gun on a chassis of a Type 4 Chi-So medium tracked carrier

Self-propelled guns

Tank-based

Other

Armored cars

Armored carriers
 Type 94 Disinfecting Vehicle and Type 94 Gas Scattering Vehicle
 Type 97 Disinfecting Vehicle and Type 97 Gas Scattering Vehicle
 Type 98 So-Da armored ammunition carrier
 Type 100 Te-Re armored artillery observation vehicle
 Type 1 Ho-Ki armored personnel carrier
 Type 1 Ho-Ha half-track
 Type 4 Chi-So armored medium tracked carrier
 Type 4 Ka-Tsu armoured tracked resupply transport and amphibious torpedo craft
 Experimental light armored ATG carrier "So-To"

Armored trains
 Improvised Armored Train
 Special armoured train
 Type 94 Armored Train

Railroad vehicles

Wagons
 Wagon-1 Reconnaissance wagon
 Wagon-1 Protective wagon
 Wagon-2 Heavy Canone wagon
 Wagon-3 Light Canone wagon
 Wagon-4 Infantry wagon
 Wagon-5 Command wagon
 Wagon-6 Auxiliary tender
 Wagon-7 Materials wagon
 Wagon-7 Power Supply wagon
 Wagon-8 Infantry wagon
 Wagon-9 Light Canone wagon
 Wagon-10 Howitzer wagon
 Wagon-11 Protective wagon

Locomotives

Railroad cars
Japanese has used routinely road-railroad convertible automobiles. These are covered in "Armoured cars" section

Engineering and command
See List of Japanese Army military engineer vehicles of World War II

Trucks
 Type 94 6-Wheeled truck
 Type 95 Mini-truck
 Type 97 4-Wheeled truck
 Type 1 6-Wheeled truck
 Type 2 Heavy truck
 Toyota KB/KC truck
 Nissan 80 truck
 Nissan 180 truck
 Amphibious truck "Su-Ki"
 Isuzu Type 94 truck

Tractors & prime movers
 Type 92 5 t Prime Mover "I-Ke"
 Type 98 6 t Prime Mover "Ro-Ke"
 Type 92 8 t Prime Mover "Ni-Ku"
 Type 95 13 t Prime Mover "Ho-Fu"
 Type 94 4 t Prime Mover "Yo-Ke"
 Type 98 4 t Prime Mover "Shi-Ke"
 Type 96 AA Gun Prime Mover
 Type 98 20 mm AA Machine Cannon Carrier
 Type 98 Half-tracked Prime Mover "Ko-Hi"
 Type 98 20 mm AA Half-Track Vehicle
 Experimental Heavy Gun Tractor Chi-Ke
 Experimental Crawler Truck
 T G Experimental Crawler Truck
 Fordson Prime Mover
 The Pavessi Gun Tractor
 The 50 hp Gun Tractor
 Komatsu 3 ton Tractor
 Light Prime Mover
 Clarton Prime Mover
 The Holt 30

Passenger cars (not armoured)
 Toyota AA/AB/AC
 Type 93 6/4-Wheeled Passenger Car
 Type 95 Passenger Car "Kurogane"
 Type 98 Passenger Car
 Model 97 Nissan Staff Car, Nissan 70

Motorcycles
 Various Harley-Davidson
 Rikuo Motorcycle
 Type 97 Motorcycle (licensed Harley-Davidson, Rikuo production)

Miscellaneous vehicles
 Type 94 Ambulance
 Type 94 Repair Vehicle

Army vessels

River-crossing crafts
 Type 95 Collapsible Boat
 Type 99 Pontoon Bridge
 Rubber Rafts

Landing craft
 Personnel Landing Craft "Shohatsu"
 Personnel Landing Craft "Chuhatsu"
 Vehicle Landing Craft "Daihatsu"
 Vehicle Landing Craft "Toku-Daihatsu"
 Vehicle Landing Craft "Mokusei-Daihatsu"

Motorboats
 Speedboat Model Ko
 Speedboat Model Otsu
 Suicide-Attack Motorboat "Maru-Re"

Gun boats
 Armored Boat "AB-Tei"
 Submarine-chaser "Karo-Tei"

IJA Landing craft/aircraft carriers
 Hei-class Landing Craft Carrier "Shinshu Maru"
 Hei-class Landing Craft/Aircraft Carrier "Akitsu Maru"
 Hei-class Landing Craft/Aircraft Carrier "Kumano Maru"
 Ko-class Landing Craft Carrier "Mayasan Maru"
 Ko-class Landing Craft Carrier "Kibitsu Maru"
 Ko-class Landing Craft Carrier "Tamatsu Maru"
 Ko-class Landing Craft Carrier "Hyuga Maru"
 Ko-class Landing Craft Carrier "Settsu Maru"
 Otsu-class Landing Craft Carrier "Takatsu Maru"

Transport vessels
 Tank Landing Ship "SS-Tei"
 Fast Transport Vessel "Yi-Go"
 Transport Submarine "Maru-Yu"

Navy ships and war vessels

 List of ships of the Imperial Japanese Navy
 Military production during World War II
 List of ships of the Second World War

Aircraft

 Military production during World War II

Secret weapons

Army secret weapons
 Remote-control special vehicle "I-Go"
 Unmanned miniature special vehicle "Ya-I"
 Remote-control special working cable car
 Experimental mortar weapon "Ite-Go"
 Remote-control boat "Isu-Go"
 Rocket cannon "Ro-Go"
 Nuclear project "Mishina"
 Engine stopcock "Ha-Go"
 Radio signal jamming device "Ho-Go"
 Electromagnetic anti-tank weapon "To-Go"
 VHF wave application research "Chi-Go"
 High voltage weapon "Ka-Go"
 High voltage obstacle-destroying weapon "Kaha-Go"
 High voltage conductive wire obstacles "Kake-Go"
 High voltage conductive wire net launching rocket "Kate-Go"
 Infrared ray detecting device "Ne-Go"
 Mine-detecting sonar for landing operations "Ra-Go"
 Remote radio-control device "Mu-Go"
 Radio-controlled boat with remote sonar and depth charge deployment device "Musu-Go"
 Device to cause artificial lightning flashes through ray-scattering "U-Go"
 Night vision system "No-Go"
 Microwave heat ray "Ku-Go" (developed at the No. 9 Special Warfare Army Laboratory)
 Infrared homing bomb "Ke-Go"
 Intercontinental balloon bomb "Fu-Go"
 Optical communication device "Ko-Go"
 Rope-launching rocket system "Te-Go"
 Blinding light ray device "Ki-Go"
 Propaganda transmission device "Se-Go"
 Advanced sonar system "Su-Go"
 Anti-tank explosive spear suicide weapon "Shitotsubakurai"
 Experimental armour for machine gunner
 Experimental reconnaissance aircraft "Te-Go"
 Reconnaissance autogyro "Ka-Go"
 Defoliant bacteria bomb
 Ceramic flea-dispersal bomb for plague propagation
 Plan to collapse Chinese economy through introduction of counterfeit yuan

Navy secret weapons
 I-Go 14 Type Ko-Kai 2 Modified A Type 2 I-Go 14 Aircraft Submarine
 I-Go 15 Type Otsu Type B I-Go 26 Aircraft Submarine
 I-Go 54 Type Otsu-Kai 2 Modified B Type 2 I-Go 54 Aircraft Submarine
 I-Go 400 Type I-Go 402 Aircraft Submarine
 Aichi M6A1 Seiran Torpedo-Bomber carried in subs.
 Suicide Attack Diver "Fukuryu"
 "Kaiten" Type 1 Suicide Attack Midget Submarine
 "Kairyu" Midget Submarine
 Nuclear Project "F-Go"
 Aircraft Battleship Class "Ise"

Radars

Imperial Japanese Army radars

Ground-based radar
 Ta-Chi 1 Ground-Based Target Tracking Radar Model 1
 Ta-Chi 2 Ground-Based Target Tracking Radar Model 2
 Ta-Chi 3 Ground-Based Target Tracking Radar Model 3
 Ta-Chi 4 Ground-Based Target Tracking Radar Model 4
 TypeA Bi-static Doppler Interface Detector (High Flequency Warning Device "Ko")
 Ta-Chi 6 TypeB Fixed Early Warning Device (Fixed Early Warning Device "Otsu")
 Ta-Chi 7 Type B Mobile Early Warning Device (Mobile Early Warning Device "Otsu")
 Ta-Chi 13 Aircraft Guidance System
 Ta-Chi 18 Type B Portable Early Warning Device (Portable Early Warning Device "Otsu")
 Ta-Chi 20 Fixed Early Warning Device Receiver (for Ta-Chi 6)
 Ta-Chi 24 Mobile Anti-Aircraft Radar (Japanese Wurzburg radar)
 Ta-Chi 28 Aircraft Guidance Device
 Ta-Chi 31 Ground-Based Target Tracking Radar Model 4 modified

Airborne radar
 Ta-Ki 1 Model 1 Airborne Surveillance Radar
 Ta-Ki 1 Model 2 Airborne Surveillance Radar
 Ta-Ki 1 Model 3 Airborne Surveillance Radar
 Ta-Ki 11 ECM Device
 Ta-Ki 15 Aircraft Guidance Device Receiver (for Tachi 13)

Shipborne radar
 Ta-Se 1 Anti-Surface Radar
 Ta-Se 2 Anti-Surface Radar

Imperial Japanese Navy Radars

Land-based radar
 Type 2 Mark 1 Model 1 Early Warning Radar ("11-Go" Early Warning Radar)
 Type 2 Mark 1 Model 1 Modify 1 Early Warning Radar ("11-Go" Model 1 Early Warning Radar)
 Type 2 Mark 1 Model 1 Modify 2 Early Warning Radar ("11-Go" Model 2 Early Warning Radar)
 Type 2 Mark 1 Model 1 Modify 3 Early Warning Radar ("11-Go" Model 3 Early Warning Radar)
 Type 2 Mark 1 Model 2 Mobil Early Warning Radar ("12-Go" Mobil Early Warning Radar)
 Type 2 Mark 1 Model 2 Modify 2 Mobil Early Warning Radar ("12-Go" Modify 2 Mobile Early Warning Radar)
 Type 2 Mark 1 Model 2 Modify 3 Mobil Early Warning Radar ("12-Go" Modify 3 Mobile Early Warning Radar)
 Type 3 Mark 1 Model 1 Early Warning Radar ("11-Go" Modified Early Warning Radar)
 Type 3 Mark 1 Model 3 Small Size Early Warning Radar ("13-Go" Small Size Early Warning Radar)
 Type 3 Mark 1 Model 4 Long-Range Air Search Radar ("14-Go" Long-Range Air Search Radar)
 Type 2 Mark 4 Model 1 Anti-aircraft Fire-Control Radar (Japanese SCR-268)
 Type 2 Mark 4 Model 2 Anti-aircraft Fire-Control Radar (Japanese SCR-268) (S24 Anti-aircraft Fire-Control Radar)

Airborne radar
 Type 3 Air Mark 6 Model 4 Airborne Ship-Search Radar (H6 Airborne Ship-Search Radar) (N6 Airborne Ship-Search Radar)
 Type 5 Model 1 Radio Location Night Vision Device

Shipborne radar
 Type 2 Mark 2 Model 1 Air Search Radar ("21-Go" Air Search Radar)
 Type 2 Mark 2 Model 2 Modify 3 Anti-Surface, Fire assisting Radar for Submarine ("21-Go" Modify 3 Anti-Surface, Fire-assisting Radar)
 Type 2 Mark 2 Model 2 Modify 4 Anti-Surface, Fire-assisting Radar for Ship ("21-Go" Modify 4 Anti-Surface, Fire-assisting Radar)
 Type 2 Mark 3 Model 1 Anti-Surface Fire-Control Radar ("31-Go" Anti-Surface Fire-Control Radar)
 Type 2 Mark 3 Model 2 Anti-Surface Fire-Control Radar ("32-Go" Anti-Surface Fire-Control Radar)
 Type 2 Mark 3 Model 3 Anti-Surface Fire-Control Radar ("33-Go" Anti-Surface Fire-Control Radar)

Missiles & bombs

Unclear IJA bombs
 Type Ro-3
 Type Ro-5
 Type Ro-7

Unclear IJN bombs
 Type 3 No.1 28-Go Bomb Type 2
 Type 3 No.1 28-Go Bomb Type 2 Modify 1
 Type 3 No.1 28-Go Bomb Type 2 Modify 2
 Type 3 No.1 28-Go Bomb "Maru-Sen"
 No.6 27-Go Bomb
 Type 3 No.25 4-Go Bomb Type 1
 Type 3 No.50 4-Go Bomb

Unclear bomb 
 Type 4456 100 kg Skipping bomb

Cartridges and shells

Cartridges

High Explosive Anti-Tank (HEAT) shells

Among them, the HEAT of Type 41 mountain gun was used in action and destroyed several Allied tanks in Burma and other places. The use of the HEAT for other guns is not known.

Other HEAT shell was the projectile of Type 94 mountain gun. The HEAT of Type 94 mountain gun was not produced though it was developed.

See also
 List of World War II weapons
 List of artillery weapons of the Imperial Japanese Navy
 List of military aircraft of Japan
 Military production during World War II

References

 Bishop, Chris (eds) The Encyclopedia of Weapons of World War II. Barnes & Nobel. 1998. 
 Chamberlain, Peter and Gander, Terry. Light and Medium Field Artillery. Macdonald and Jane's (1975). 
 Chant, Chris. Artillery of World War II, Zenith Press, 2001, 
 McLean, Donald B. Japanese Artillery; Weapons and Tactics. Wickenburg, Ariz.: Normount Technical Publications 1973. .
 
 
 
 
 
 US Department of War, TM 30-480, Handbook On Japanese Military Forces, Louisiana State University Press, 1994.

External links
 https://web.archive.org/web/20050512014429/http://www.strange-mecha.com/index.html
 Taki's Imperial Japanese Army Page - Akira Takizawa
 Color and Markings of the Japanese Explosive Ordnance at Pearl Harbor, A Summary 

Military equipments
Japan, World War II
World War II, Military equipment
World War II, Military equipment
Military equipment
World War II
 
 
World War II, Military equipment